Sareen Sports Industries (also called SS) is an Indian sports equipment manufacturing company specialising in cricket, with its headquarters located in Meerut, Uttar Pradesh. The firm was founded in 1969 by N.K. Sareen and became one of the world's leading cricket equipment manufacturers.

Sareen produces cricket clothing and equipment including bats, balls, helmet, batting gloves, protective gear, athletic shoes, bags, and clothing. The company is best known for its SS Sunridges line of bats, which debuted in 1976. SS bats are exported around the world, and have been used by several of the world's best batsmen, including Kumar Sangakkara, Yuvraj Singh, Shikhar Dhawan, Mushfiqur Rahim, Jonny Bairstow, Quinton De Kock, Liam Livingstone, and Kieron Pollard. SS bats carrying other manufacturers names have also been used by leading players, including MS Dhoni, who's bat displayed Reebok branding.

References

External links
 

Cricket equipment manufacturers
Indian companies established in 1969
Companies based in Meerut
Sporting goods manufacturers of India
1969 establishments in Uttar Pradesh
Manufacturing companies established in 1969
Sportswear brands